The 2002–03 Iraq FA Cup was the 25th edition of the Iraq FA Cup as a clubs-only competition, the main domestic cup in Iraqi football. It kicked off on 2 September 2002, and the final was played on 23 August 2003 at the Franso Hariri Stadium in Erbil rather than at Al-Shaab Stadium in Baghdad due to security reasons.

Al-Talaba were the defending champions of the cup having beaten Al-Shorta 1–0 in the 2002 final, and the same was repeated in 2003 as Al-Talaba beat Al-Shorta 1–0 again to earn their second title. The competition was halted for more than six months after the quarter-finals due to the American invasion of Iraq, but the Iraq Football Association decided to complete the tournament, reducing the semi-finals to a single leg and moving the remaining matches to the safer northern city of Erbil. The 2003 final was the last Iraq FA Cup final to be played until 2016.

First round

Second round 
Al-Shuala were automatically placed into the round of 32.

Playoff round 
Al-Sulaikh, Hatteen, Al-Kut and Al-Mashroua were eliminated from the competition. Meanwhile, Al-Nahdha, who had qualified for the round of 32, withdrew and were replaced by Al-Ramadi. The following results are known from the playoff round:

Final phase

Bracket

Round of 32 

Al-Shorta won 6–0 on aggregate.

Al-Mosul won 3–2 on aggregate.

Karbalaa won 4–0 on aggregate.

Al-Jaish won 2–1 on aggregate.

Al-Talaba won 3–2 on aggregate.

3–3 on aggregate. Al-Sinaa won on away goals.

Al-Ramadi won 4–3 on aggregate.

Al-Difaa Al-Jawi won 3–2 on aggregate.

Al-Najaf won 2–1 on aggregate.

Al-Naft won 3–0 on aggregate.

1–1 on aggregate. Al-Shuala won on away goals.

Al-Diwaniya won 2–0 on aggregate.

Al-Tharthar won 5–2 on aggregate.

Al-Basra won 7–1 on aggregate.

Brusk won 3–0 on aggregate.

2–2 on aggregate. Al-Minaa won on away goals.

Round of 16 

Al-Shorta won 11–1 on aggregate.

Al-Difaa Al-Jawi won 7–3 on aggregate.

Al-Najaf won 6–4 on aggregate.

Al-Minaa won 3–2 on aggregate.

Al-Mosul won 3–2 on aggregate.

Karbalaa won 5–3 on aggregate.

Al-Talaba won 3–0 on aggregate.

Al-Naft won 3–2 on aggregate.

Quarter-finals 

1–1 on aggregate. Al-Minaa won on away goals.

2–2 on aggregate. Al-Naft won on away goals.

Al-Talaba won 5–1 on aggregate.

Al-Shorta won 3–2 on aggregate.

Semi-finals

Final

References

External links
 Iraqi Football Website

Iraq FA Cup
Cup